The plain antvireo (Dysithamnus mentalis) is a passerine bird species in the antbird family (Thamnophilidae). It is a resident breeder in tropical Central and South America.

Taxonomy
The plain antvireo was described by the Dutch zoologist Coenraad Jacob Temminck in 1823 and given the binomial name Myothera mentalis. It is now placed in the genus Dysithamnus which was introduced by the German ornithologist Jean Cabanis in 1847.

There are 18 subspecies:
 D. m. septentrionalis Ridgway, 1908 – south Mexico to west Panama
 D. m. suffusus Nelson, 1912 – east Panama and northwest Colombia
 D. m. extremus Todd, 1916 – central Colombia
 D. m. semicinereus Sclater, PL, 1855 – west central Colombia
 D. m. viridis Aveledo & Pons, 1952 – north Colombia and northwest Venezuela
 D. m. cumbreanus Hellmayr & Seilern, 1915 – north Venezuela
 D. m. andrei Hellmayr, 1906 – northeast Venezuela, Trinidad
 D. m. oberi Ridgway, 1908 – Tobago
 D. m. ptaritepui Zimmer, JT & Phelps, 1946 – tepuis of south Venezuela
 D. m. spodionotus Salvin & Godman, 1883 – south Venezuela and north Brazil
 D. m. aequatorialis Todd, 1916 – west Ecuador and northwest Peru
 D. m. napensis Chapman, 1925 – south Colombia to north Peru
 D. m. tambillanus Taczanowski, 1884 – north and central Peru
 D. m. olivaceus (Tschudi, 1844) – central and south central Peru
 D. m. tavarae Zimmer, JT, 1932 – southeast Peru to central Bolivia
 D. m. emiliae Hellmayr, 1912 – northeast Brazil
 D. m. affinis Pelzeln, 1868 – central Brazil and northeast Bolivia
 D. m. mentalis (Temminck, 1823) – southeast Brazil, east Paraguay and northeast Argentina

Description

The adult male of the nominate race has a slate grey head and upperparts, blackish cheeks, three narrow white wing bars, pale grey underparts and a white belly. The female has olive brown upperparts, a rufous crown, a white eye-ring, yellowish-buff underparts and weakly buff-barred rufous wings. A white (male) or buff (female) shoulder stripe is only visible when the wing is spread. Immature males are much like the adult male, but have brown edgings to the flight feathers, an olive rump and yellowish underparts.

Depending on subspecies, there are large variations in the plumage of both sexes, especially in the colour of the underparts (yellow to white), the darkness of the face, the amount of olive to the upperparts of the male, and the amount of rufous to the upperparts of the female.

It has a musical buu-bu-bu-bu-u-u-u song, and calls include a weak naaa and a questioning bu-u-u-u-u?

Distribution and habitat
This is a common and confiding bird of primary and secondary forest. The plain antvireo breeds from southern Mexico south to northern Argentina, and on Trinidad and Tobago. It is patchily distributed at the margins of its range and generally (but not universally) avoids the lowlands.

In Guyana for example, it is at least locally common above 1,000 meters ASL in the Pakaraima Mountains (though not Mount Roraima), and also inhabits the southern Acari Mountains. On the other hand, it has not been recorded from the Iwokrama Forest or the Potaro Plateau. In Nicaragua where upland habitat is mainly restricted to the northwest, the species occurs only here and there in most of the country. For example, the plain antvireo was found to be common, a few dozen meters ASL, in the Dipteryx oleifera-dominated primary forest of Refugio Bartola in the very south of Nicaragua.

Behaviour and ecology
The plain antvireo feeds like a vireo of the songbird family Vireonidae, hence its common name. It forages for small insects and other arthropods taken from twigs and foliage in the lower branches of trees. It usually does not join mixed-species feeding flocks often, preferring to keep its distance from other species it encounters when attending army ant swarms. Locally, however (e.g. as noted in the somewhat atypical habitat of Refugio Bartola), it may attend mixed-species flocks more frequently. But usually, it is encountered in pairs or small groups, such as adults with last years' young or birds congregating at a special food source. Breeding pairs are quite territorial against conspecifics however, and defend a patch of habitat that may be as large as about 7,000 square metres, but sometimes is only half that size.

The female lays two cinnamon-marked white eggs in a small deep cup nest in the lateral fork of a sapling. The eggs are incubated by both parents for 15 days to hatching, with a further 9 days to fledging. If the nest is approached, an incubating bird will drop to the ground and flutter weakly to distract the potential predator. During this, the light shoulder stripe is flashed conspicuously to attract the intruder's attention to the parent.

Due to its large range, this species is not considered threatened by the IUCN. It appears to be tolerant of some degree of habitat disturbance and/or human activity.

References

Sources

 Duca, Charles; Guerra, Tadeu J. & Marini, Miguel Â. (2006): Territory size of three Antbirds (Aves, Passeriformes) in an Atlantic Forest fragment in southeastern Brazil. [English with Portuguese abstract] Revista Brasileira de Zoologia 23 (3): 692–698.  PDF fulltext
 Machado, C. G. (1999): A composição dos bandos mistos de aves na Mata Atlântica da Serra de Paranapiacaba, no sudeste brasileiro [Mixed flocks of birds in Atlantic Rain Forest in Serra de Paranapiacaba, southeastern Brazil]. Revista Brasileira de Biologia 59 (1): 75–85 [Portuguese with English abstract].  PDF fulltext
 Múnera-Roldán, Claudia; Cody, Martin L.; Schiele-Zavala, Robin H.; Sigel, Bryan J.; Woltmann, Stefan & Kjeldsen, Jørgen Peter (2007): New and noteworthy records of birds from south-eastern Nicaragua. Bulletin of the British Ornithologists' Club 127 (2): 152–161. PDF fulltext
 O'Shea, B.J.; Milensky, Christopher M.; Claramunt, Santiago; Schmidt, Brian K.; Gebhard, Christina A.; Schmitt, C. Gregory & Erskine, Kristine T. (2007): New records for Guyana, with description of the voice of Roraiman Nightjar Caprimulgus whitelyi. Bulletin of the British Ornithologists' Club 127 (2): 118–128. PDF fulltext

Further reading

External links

Xeno-canto: audio recordings of the plain antvireo

Dysithamnus
Antbirds
Birds described in 1823
Birds of Central America
Birds of South America